Cara Black and Sania Mirza were the defending champions and successfully defended their title, defeating Garbiñe Muguruza and Carla Suárez Navarro in the final, 6–2, 7–5.

Seeds

Draw

Draw

References 
 Main Draw

Toray Pan Pacific Open Doubles
2014 Women's Doubles
2014 Toray Pan Pacific Open